Carex repanda is a tussock-forming species of perennial sedge in the family Cyperaceae. It is native to Assam in northern eastern India.

See also
List of Carex species

References

repanda
Plants described in 1894
Taxa named by Charles Baron Clarke
Flora of Assam (region)